A Ventriculotomy is any intrusion into a ventricle. It may specifically refer to:

 Ventriculotomy (cardiac), involving an intrusion into a ventricle of the heart
 Ventriculotomy (neurological), involving an intrusion into a ventricle of the brain